Ellis County is the name of several counties in the United States:

Ellis County, Kansas 
Ellis County, Oklahoma 
Ellis County, Texas